Waverly Village Hall is a historic village hall located at Waverly in Tioga County, New York, United States.  It is a -story brick and masonry building built in 1892.  The architect was J. H. Pierce and the builder Sherman A. Genung. The most dominant feature of the building is the Queen Anne style bell tower.

It was listed on the National Register of Historic Places in 2003.

References

City and town halls on the National Register of Historic Places in New York (state)
Government buildings completed in 1892
Buildings and structures in Tioga County, New York
Village halls in the United States
National Register of Historic Places in Tioga County, New York